No Time for Nuts is a computer-animated short film from Blue Sky Studios, starring Scrat from Ice Age. Directed by Chris Renaud and Mike Thurmeier, it was released on November 21, 2006, on the DVD and Blu-ray release of Ice Age: The Meltdown. It follows Scrat on a chase after his nut, which has been accidentally sent forward in time by a frozen time machine. No Time for Nuts was nominated for the 2007 Academy Award for Best Animated Short Film (but lost to The Danish Poet), and also won an Annie Award.

Plot
After the events of the second film and before the events of the third film, Scrat is trying to find a place to hide his acorn after he got it back, but ends up digging up a buried time machine over an ice-encased skeletal body of a human time traveler. The machine activates, stating the date that Scrat is in (May 26, 20,000 B.C.) While sniffing around the machine, he accidentally presses a button on it, and the machine powers up and then zaps the acorn. Scrat gets angry and tries to beat up the time machine, but it zaps him too, sending him to the Middle Ages, where he finds the acorn wedged under a rock. Scrat sees Excalibur, the sword in the stone, and decides to use it to move the rock and get back his acorn. He pulls out the sword but then finds himself under attack by a group of off-screen/unseen Robin Hood archers, and uses the sword to block the arrows fired by the archers. He inadvertently frees the acorn in the process (and gets his tail wedged in the rock and having to yank it free) and takes it and the time machine and races off to find cover, only to hide in the barrel of a lit cannon. The cannon fires him into the path of hundreds of incoming arrows. The time machine zaps the acorn mid-flight and Scrat narrowly manages to activate the machine again for himself.

He materializes in the Coliseum during Ancient Rome. Scrat reaches for his acorn, but is dragged off when his tail is caught by a passing horse-drawn chariot. Scrat tries to pull his tail off, and begins to enjoy the ride (as he is "laughing" as the chariot pulls him) just as his crotch bashes against a rock. He then finds his acorn just as a fanfare sounds. He thinks it is victory music and introduces himself to the crowd like a triumphant gladiator, proudly holding up his acorn. Then he hears the growl of a lion coming from the tunnel behind him. He fires the time machine again before the lion can attack him, and lands on an ice field. He is overjoyed, thinking he is home, but he soon sees the RMS Titanic appear out of nowhere, heading straight towards him; he is actually in April 14, 1912 A.D. and on the frozen North Atlantic, the time and location of the ship's sinking. Scrat gets pressed into the iceberg that sank the Titanic by the ship's bow, and the time machine zaps Scrat and the acorn as they fall from the iceberg, taking Scrat to the time of the first Ice Age movie, where he encounters his past self, and the two Scrats fight each other for the acorn (Manny, Sid, Diego and Roshan are standing in the background watching the two fighting). The time machine is caught in the fight, and it zaps the acorn out of sight yet again, much to the distress of both past Scrat and future Scrat. Shortly after, future Scrat also gets zapped (after past Scrat angrily kicks the machine).

Scrat is then sent into many dangerous situations where he would have been killed if he had not activated the time machine in time; under a launching Saturn V rocket during the Space Race, in a dark, modern-day jewelry store (where he sets off the security alarms and lasers when he picks up a diamond he mistakes for his acorn), in a girl's locker room in the present (where he is hit by a roller brush), in the French Revolution (where he appears under the falling blade of a guillotine), during Benjamin Franklin's kite flying experiment (and almost gets electrocuted), in the path of a wrecking ball demolishing an old brick building, in front of the Hiroshima bombing, in the path of an oncoming train in the Wild West, and in front of the groin of Michelangelo's David (the latter does not threaten him, but he is rather embarrassed). Concerned, Scrat punches the machine, which sends him into a strange dimension (possibly a time vortex) of various timepieces. Scrat spots his acorn but briefly gets split into clones by a clock and grabs it just before being drawn into a wormhole along with his acorn and the time machine.

The time machine kidnaps Scrat, the acorn and the wormhole explosion in front of an enormous oak tree. Overjoyed at the sight of so many acorns, he tosses away his own acorn, which lands on and almost causes the time machine to fire again, but not before Scrat pulverizes it. Scrat attempts to remove the nuts from the tree, but soon discovers that it is only a monument of some sort, with a plaque on it reading "Here Stood the Last Oak Tree"; Scrat is in the distant future, where oak trees (and therefore acorns) are extinct. He realizes that the acorn he brought with him is the only real one around. He makes a dash for it, but the time machine somehow fires one final time, transporting the acorn right out of his paws right before the time machine collapses into pieces. Stranded in the acorn-less future, Scrat lets out a scream of frustration, ending the film and the forever-lost acorn ends up floating behind the credits.

Cast
 Chris Wedge as Scrat
 Ray Romano as Manny (4-D release only)
 John Leguizamo as Sid (4-D release only)
 Denis Leary as Diego (4-D release only)

Awards

Won
 2006: Annie Award—Best Animated Short Subject

Nominated
 2007: Academy Award—Best Animated Short Film

Ice Age: No Time for Nuts 4-D
In 2015, an extended 12-minute version of the short, featuring new footage with Scrat ending up in the Mesozoic era, an American natural history museum in 2015 AD,  and then in the year 2552 AD was remade by SimEx-Iwerks into a 4D film, titled Ice Age: No Time For Nuts 4-D. Since then, the film has been shown at the San Diego Zoo, The Adventuredome in Las Vegas, NV, Columbus Zoo and Aquarium in Powell, Ohio, Kennywood in Pittsburgh, Detroit Zoo in Michigan, Alton Towers (2015 - 2016), the Central Park Zoo in New York City, and somewhere in Fleetwood cinema  in the United Kingdom, Gardaland Park in Italy, Madame Tussauds Shanghai, Movie Park Germany, Futuroscope in France, and İstanbul in Turkey. Also, the movie is being screened at Maritime Aquarium at Norwalk.

References

External links
 
 
 
 Co-director Chris Renaud on No Time for Nuts—Animated News & Views interview

YouTube
 Ice Age: No Time for Nuts 4-D

2006 direct-to-video films
2006 short films
2006 science fiction films
2000s animated short films
Animated films without speech
American animated short films
American animated science fiction films
Computer-animated short films
Ice Age (franchise) films
Animated films about time travel
20th Century Fox short films
2006 computer-animated films
Blue Sky Studios short films
Best Animated Short Subject Annie Award winners
2000s American animated films
Films directed by Mike Thurmeier
Amusement rides introduced in 2015
Amusement park films
3D short films
4D films
Amusement rides based on film franchises
Films directed by Chris Renaud
American comedy short films
American direct-to-video films
American science fiction short films